Helicigona is a genus of medium-sized, air-breathing land snails, terrestrial pulmonate gastropod mollusks in the subfamily Ariantinae of the family Helicidae, the typical snails.

Anatomy
These snails create and use love darts during mating.

Species
Species within the genus Helicigona include:
 † Helicigona atava Wenz, 1927 
 Helicigona banatica
 † Helicigona chaignoni (Locard, 1883) 
 Helicigona cingulata
 Helicigona cingulella
 Helicigona cornea
 Helicigona cyclolabis
 Helicigona eichwaldi
 Helicigona faustina
 Helicigona foeteus
 Helicigona furva
 Helicigona glacialis
 Helicigona hoffmanni
 Helicigona insolita
 Helicigona kleciachi
 Helicigona lapicida (Linnaeus, 1758)
 Helicigona olympica
 Helicigona phocea
 † Helicigona planata H. Binder, 2002 
 Helicigona planospira
 Helicigona pratensis
 Helicigona presli
  Helicigona quimpereana
  Helicigona rumelica
 Helicigona schmidtii
 † Helicigona schwarzbachi Schlickum & Strauch, 1979 
  Helicigona serbica
  Helicigona setigera
  Helicigona setosa
  Helicigona subzonata
  Helicigona terceirana
  Helicigona tiesenhauseni
 Helicigona trizona
 † Helicigona wenzi Soós, 1934

References

External links 

Helicidae
Gastropod genera